Roanoke County Public Schools is the branch of the government of Roanoke County, Virginia responsible for public K–12 education. Like all public school systems in Virginia, it is legally classified as a school division. Although it performs the functions of school districts in other U.S. states, it lacks independent taxing authority and relies on appropriations from the local government.

Schools

High Schools
Burton Center for Arts & Technology - Salem
Cave Spring High School - Cave Spring
Glenvar High School - Glenvar
Hidden Valley High School - Cave Spring
Northside High School - North Roanoke
William Byrd High School - Vinton

Middle Schools
Cave Spring Middle School - Cave Spring
Glenvar Middle School - Glenvar
Hidden Valley Middle School - Roanoke
Northside Middle School - North Roanoke
William Byrd Middle School - Vinton

Elementary Schools
Back Creek Elementary School
Bonsack Elementary School
Burlington Elementary School
Cave Spring Elementary School
Clearbrook Elementary School
Fort Lewis Elementary School
Glen Cove Elementary School
Glenvar Middle School
Green Valley Elementary School
Herman L. Horn Elementary School
Mason's Cove Elementary School
Mount Pleasant Elementary School
Mountain View Elementary School
Oak Grove Elementary School
Penn Forest Elementary School
W.E. Cundiff Elementary School

Feeder School Pattern

Cave Spring
Back Creek Elementary School
Cave Spring Elementary School (split with Hidden Valley)
Clearbrook Elementary School
Green Valley Elementary School (split with Hidden Valley)
Penn Forest Elementary School

Glenvar
Fort Lewis Elementary School
Glenvar Elementary School
Mason's Cove Elementary School

Hidden Valley
Cave Spring Elementary School (split with Cave Spring)
Green Valley Elementary School (split with Cave Spring)
Oak Grove Elementary School

Northside
Burlington Elementary School
Glen Cove Elementary School
Mountain View Elementary School

William Byrd
Bonsack Elementary School
Herman L. Horn Elementary School
Mount Pleasant Elementary School
W.E. Cundiff Elementary School

References
https://www.rcps.us/

Education in Roanoke County, Virginia
School divisions in Virginia